Saint Andrew North Central is a parliamentary constituency represented in the House of Representatives of the Jamaican Parliament. It elects one Member of Parliament MP by the first past the post system of election.

Members 
Karl Samuda since the 1980 Jamaican general election

Boundaries 

Includes the communities of Norbrook and Whitehall.

References

Parliamentary constituencies of Jamaica